Vesole is a mountain of Campania, Italy.  It has an elevation of 1,210 metres above sea level.

Mountains of Campania